Gary C. Cornia is an American professor who was the eighth Dean of the Marriott School of Management at Brigham Young University. He received a B.S. in Economics in 1972 from Weber State University and a M.S. in Economics two years later from the Jon M. Huntsman School of Business at Utah State University. He subsequently earned a Ph.D. in Public finance from the Ohio State University in 1979.  Cornia served as dean on from 2008 to 2013.

References

External links 
"A Closer Look at Cornia"

1948 births
Latter Day Saints from Ohio
Brigham Young University faculty
Living people
Ohio State University Fisher College of Business alumni
Utah State University alumni
Weber State University alumni
Business school deans
Latter Day Saints from Utah
American university and college faculty deans